Apes Dale is a hamlet situated in the parish of Lickey and Blackwell, in the Bromsgrove district of Worcestershire, England.

References

Hamlets in Worcestershire